Gary Dusenberg (born July 5, 1946) is an American politician who served in the Missouri House of Representatives from the 54th district from 2003 to 2011.

References

1946 births
Living people
Republican Party members of the Missouri House of Representatives